is a Japanese 2-episode OVA anime series created and produced by Studio Fantasia and directed by Katsuhiko Nishijima. It was released from September 25, 2000 to December 21, 2000. The OVA was licensed by Central Park Media under the U.S. Manga Corps label.

Plot
Galan is a spastic Russian geek who'd do anything to be a real, living samurai. When his girlfriend Natsu (who happens to be a Japanese princess living in Russia) gifts him an ancient sword, strange events unfold, and even stranger people drop out of the sky to attack. Now Galan must overcome his ineptitude and join a bunch of beautiful women in a wacky romp through a kingdom that time forgot.

Production 
The anime was directed by Katsuhiko Nishijima who had previously directed Project A-Ko and Agent Aika.

Episode list 
 Episode 1: Samurai Labyrinth? Lovebyrinth? 
 Episode 2: Treasure Labyrinth? Loverinth?

Cast

Reception
Anime News Network's Maral Agnerian recommends it, calling it a "well-done 2-episode OVA that neatly balances gratuitous fanservice with bizarre comedy, with a bit of action thrown into the mix." However, THEM Anime Reviews gave it a negative review, calling the plot non-existent and mainly revolving around two things: Natsu's father being a pervert and Galan screwing up.

Dave Haverson of Play magazine praised the anime calling it "an unexpected comedy blast."

References

External links

2000 anime OVAs
Action anime and manga
Bandai Visual
Central Park Media
Comedy anime and manga
Romance anime and manga
Studio Fantasia